Tubarão is a municipality in Santa Catarina state, Brazil.

Tubarão may also refer to:
 Tubarão River, a river in Santa Catarina state, Brazil
 Port of Tubarão, a port in Espírito Santo state, Brazil
 Tubarão people, an ethnic group of Rondônia state, Brazil
 Tubarão language, a language spoken in Rondônia state, Brazil
 Tubarão Futebol Clube, a Brazilian football club (not to be confused with Clube Atlético Tubarão)
 Bruno Tubarão, Brazilian football player

Language and nationality disambiguation pages